Behnam Sadeghi (born September 16, 1969) is a scholar of Islamic law and history. He was assistant professor of religious studies at Stanford University from 2006 to 2016.

Biography
Sadeghi received his PhD in 2006 from Princeton University. His doctoral dissertation investigated textual interpretation methods used in the Hanafi school of law during the pre-modern period. He has conducted research on the early history of the Qur'an, hadith literature, and early legal debates about women in the public sphere.

Works
 The Logic of Law Making in Islam: Women and Prayer in the Legal Tradition

See also
 Ahmed El Shamsy
 Walid Saleh

References

Stanford University faculty
Living people
Princeton University alumni
Scholars of Islamic jurisprudence
1969 births